The PTRD-41 (Shortened from Russian, ProtivoTankovoye Ruzhyo Degtyaryova; Противотанковое однозарядное ружьё системы Дегтярёва образца 1941 года; "Degtyaryov Single Shot Anti-Tank Weapon System Model of 1941") is an anti-tank rifle that was produced and used from early 1941 by the Soviet Red Army during World War II. It is a single-shot weapon which fires the 14.5×114 mm round, which was able to penetrate German tanks such as the Panzer III and early models of the Panzer IV. Although unable to penetrate the frontal armor of late-war German tanks, it could penetrate their thinner side armor at close ranges as  well as thinly armored self-propelled guns and half-tracks.

History 

In 1939, in its invasion of Poland the USSR captured several hundred Polish Model 35 anti-tank rifles, which had proved effective against the German invasion of Poland from the West. Vasily Degtyaryov copied its lock and several features of the German Panzerbüchse 38 when hasty construction of an anti-tank rifle was ordered in July 1941.

The PTRD and the similar but semi-automatic PTRS-41 were the only individual anti-tank weapons available to the Red Army in numbers upon the outbreak of the war with Germany. The 64g bullet had a 39g steel core and could penetrate around 30mm of armor at 500m, and 40mm of armor at 100m. During the initial invasion, and indeed throughout the war, most German tanks had side armor thinner than 40 mm (Panzer I and Panzer II: 13–20 mm, Panzer III and Panzer IV series: 30 mm, Panzer V Panther (combat debut mid-1943): 40–50 mm).

Guns captured by the Germans were given the designation 14.5 mm PzB 783(r).

After World War II the PTRD was also used extensively by North Korean and Chinese armed forces in the Korean War. During this war, William Brophy, an American Army Ordnance officer, mounted a .50 BMG (12.7 mm) barrel to a captured PTRD to examine the effectiveness of long-range shooting. Furthermore, Americans also captured certain number of PTRD from Viet Cong in Vietnam War.

Users

Current
:  Used by pro-Russian militias in 2014.

Former

 : Equipped with 300 items (both PTRD & PTRS) by Soviet Union between 1944 and 1945, seen in combat operations.
 : Used in Chinese Civil War, later by People's Volunteer Army during Korean War.
 : Used by 1st Czechoslovak Army Corps in the USSR.
 : Captured and used by Wehrmacht under the title Panzerbüchse 783(r).
 : Equipped by the USSR, saw extensive combat in Korean War against M24 light tanks.
 : Used by 1st Tadeusz Kościuszko Infantry Division in 1943 then by other Polish divisions.
 : In stockpile, used by Viet Cong in Vietnam War.
 : Largely used in Eastern Front by the Red Army.

See also
List of Russian weaponry
PTRS-41

References

External links 

Russian 14.5 mm antitank rifle PTRD-1941
The PTRD 1941

Anti-tank rifles of the Soviet Union
World War II infantry weapons of the Soviet Union
Degtyarev Plant products
Weapons and ammunition introduced in 1941